The George Haven House, also known as The Oaks, is a historic building located in Chatfield, Minnesota, United States. The Italianate house was built in 1874, and the Greek Revival cottage, also known as the Lucian Johnson House, was completed in 1892. It is next door to Oakenwald Terrace. At one time what is now three properties were on the same estate of Jason C. Easton. They are representative of the commercial and financial prosperity of Chatfield. The Hanson and Johnson houses were listed together on the National Register of Historic Places in 1982.

References

Houses completed in 1874
Houses completed in 1892
Houses in Fillmore County, Minnesota
Italianate architecture in Minnesota
Greek Revival houses in Minnesota
Houses on the National Register of Historic Places in Minnesota
National Register of Historic Places in Fillmore County, Minnesota